The 1992 ICF World Junior Canoe Slalom Championships were the 4th edition of the ICF World Junior Canoe Slalom Championships. The event took place on the Sjoa river in Norway from 5 to 12 July 1992 under the auspices of the International Canoe Federation (ICF).

Seven medal events took place. The C2 team event was not held.

Medal summary

Men

Canoe

Kayak

Women

Kayak

Medal table

References

External links
International Canoe Federation

ICF World Junior Canoe Slalom Championships
ICF World Junior and U23 Canoe Slalom Championships